Kensington-on-Sea is how some Media and News Papers in the UK named a part of Corfu Island Located in the North and North East of the Island. Greek island of Corfu.

The area was named after Kensington, West London, for the wealthy tourists who spend their holidays there.

References

Corfu
Tourism in Greece
Greece–United Kingdom relations